Blaze Autumn Berdahl (born September 6, 1980) is an American actress best known for her roles as Lenni Frazier in the children's television series Ghostwriter and Ellie Creed in the film Pet Sematary (1989).

Early life 
Berdahl was born on September 6, 1980, in New York City, the youngest daughter of Rita, a teacher, and Roger Berdahl, an actor. She was born just one minute after her twin sister, Beau Dakota Berdahl, a talent agent. She also has an older brother, Sky Ashley Berdahl, a periodontist. Berdahl was a student at Bucknell University in Lewisburg, Pennsylvania.

Career 
Berdahl made her film debut in the 1989 Stephen King adaptation of Pet Sematary.

She did voiceover work for Richard Scarry's Best ABC Video Ever! in 1989.

From 1992 to 1995 she played Lenni Frazier on the PBS children's show Ghostwriter. She also appeared on the TV series Aliens in the Family and Third Watch.

As an adult, Berdahl is primarily an announcer and narrator.

Personal life 

On July 15, 2007, Berdahl married Stephen M. Tvardek of Hoboken, New Jersey. Tvardek is an S&P futures trader. The ceremony was held at the Onteora Mountain House in Boiceville, New York.

References

External links 

Blaze Berdahl

1980 births
Actresses from New York City
American child actresses
American film actresses
American television actresses
American voice actresses
Living people
20th-century American actresses
21st-century American actresses
Bucknell University alumni
American twins
Actresses from New Jersey